Aloysius Tyrone Foster (born January 18, 1943) is an American jazz drummer. Foster's professional career began in the mid-60s, when he played and recorded with hard bop and swing musicians including Blue Mitchell and Illinois Jacquet. Foster played jazz fusion with Miles Davis during the 70s and was one of the few people to have contact with Davis during his retirement from 1975–1980. During Davis's retirement, Foster continued to play and record acoustic jazz with Sonny Rollins, Dexter Gordon, McCoy Tyner, Horace Silver, and other band leaders. Foster played on Miles Davis's 1981 comeback album The Man with the Horn, and was the only musician to play in Davis's band both before, and after, his retirement. After leaving Davis's band in the mid-80s, Foster toured and recorded with Herbie Hancock, Sonny Rollins, Joe Henderson, and many other band leaders, primarily working in acoustic jazz settings. Foster has also released several solo albums under his own name, starting with Mixed Roots in 1978.

Biography
Foster was born in Richmond, Virginia, United States, and grew up in New York. He began playing drums at the age of 13 and made his recording debut on Blue Mitchell's, The Thing to Do, at age 20.

He joined Miles Davis's group when Jack DeJohnette left in 1972, and played with Davis until 1985. In his 1989 autobiography, Davis described the first time he heard Foster play live in 1972 at the Cellar Club in Manhattan: "He [Foster] knocked me out because he had such a groove and he would just lay it right in there. That was the kind of thing I was looking for. Al could set it up for everybody else to play off and just keep the groove going forever."

Foster began composing in the 1970s, and has toured with his own band, including musicians such as bassist Doug Weiss, saxophonist Dayna Stephens, and pianist Adam Birnbaum.

Discography

As leader 
 Mixed Roots (CBS/Sony, 1978)
 Mr. Foster (Better Days, 1979)
 Brandyn (Laika, 1997)
 Oh! (ScoLoHoFo) with Joe Lovano, John Scofield, Dave Holland (Blue Note, 2003) – recorded in 2002
 Love, Peace and Jazz! Live at the Village Vanguard with Eli Degibri, Kevin Hays, Doug Weiss (JazzEyes, 2008)
 The Paris Concert (Inakustic, 2008)[DVD-Video]
 Inspirations and Dedications (Smoke Sessions, 2019)
 Reflections (Smoke Sessions, 2022)

As sideman 

With Kenny Barron
 Landscape (Baystate, 1985) – recorded in 1984
 Super Standard (Venus, 2004)

With Joanne Brackeen
 Havin' Fun (Concord Jazz, 1985) 
 Fi-Fi Goes to Heaven (Concord Jazz, 1987) – recorded in 1986

With Miles Davis
 In Concert: Live at Philharmonic Hall (Columbia, 1973)
 Big Fun (Columbia, 1974)
 Get Up with It (Columbia, 1974)
 Dark Magus (Columbia, 1974)
 Agharta (Columbia, 1975)
 Pangaea (Columbia, 1976)
 The Man with the Horn (Columbia, 1981)
 We Want Miles (Columbia, 1981)
 Star People (Columbia, 1983)
 Decoy (Columbia, 1984)
 You're Under Arrest (Columbia, 1985)
 Amandla (Warner Bros., 1989)
 Miles Davis at Newport 1955-1975: The Bootleg Series Vol. 4 (Columbia Legacy, 2015)

With Tommy Flanagan
 The Magnificent Tommy Flanagan (Progressive, 1981)
 Giant Steps (Enja, 1982)
 Nights at the Vanguard (Uptown, 1986)

With Joe Henderson
 The State of the Tenor, Vols. 1 & 2 (Blue Note, 1986) – recorded in 1985
 An Evening with Joe Henderson (Red, 1987)
 So Near, So Far (Verve, 1993)

With Duke Jordan
 Duke's Delight (SteepleChase, 1976) – recorded in 1975
 Lover Man (SteepleChase, 1979) – recorded in 1975

With Dave Liebman
 Light'n Up, Please! (Horizon, 1976)
 Pendulum (Artists House, 1978)

With Blue Mitchell
 The Thing to Do (Blue Note, 1964)
 Down with It! (Blue Note, 1965)
 Heads Up! (Blue Note, 1967)

With Frank Morgan
 Yardbird Suite (Contemporary, 1988)
 Reflections (Contemporary, 1989)
 Mood Indigo (Antilles, 1989)

With Art Pepper
 New York Album (Galaxy, 1985) – recorded in 1979
 So in Love (Artists House, 1979)

With Cecil Payne
 Brooklyn Brothers (Muse, 1973) – also with Duke Jordan
 Bird Gets the Worm (Muse, 1976)

With Chris Potter
 Pure (Concord, 1995) – recorded in 1994
 Sundiata (Criss Cross Jazz, 1995) – recorded in 1993

With Sonny Rollins
 Don't Ask (Milestone, 1979)
 Love at First Sight (Milestone, 1980)
 Here's to the People (Milestone, 1991)
 Sonny Rollins + 3 (Milestone, 1995)

With McCoy Tyner
 Horizon (Milestone, 1980) – recorded in 1979
 Quartets 4 X 4 (Milestone, 1980)
 It's About Time with Jackie McLean (Blue Note, 1985)
 New York Reunion (Chesky, 1991)
 McCoy Tyner with Stanley Clarke and Al Foster (Telarc, 2000) – recorded in 1999
 McCoy Tyner Plays John Coltrane (Impulse!, 2001) – recorded in 1997

With Cedar Walton
 Animation (Columbia, 1978) – recorded in 1977-78
 Soundscapes (Columbia, 1980)
 Seasoned Wood (HighNote, 2008)

With Larry Willis
 A New Kind of Soul (LLP, 1970)
 Inner Crisis (Groove Merchant, 1973)
 My Funny Valentine (Jazz City, 1988)
 The Big Push (HighNote, 2006)

With Steve Kuhn
 The Vanguard Date with Ron Carter (Sunnyside/E1, 1986)
 Life's Magic with Ron Carter (Sunnyside/E1, 1986)
 Seasons of Romance (Postcards, 1995)
 Live at Birdland with Ron Carter (Blue Note, 2006)

With others
 George Adams, Paradise Space Shuttle (Timeless, 1979)
 Richie Beirach, Elegie For Bill Evans (Trio, 1981)
 Walter Bishop Jr., Hot House (Muse, 1979) – recorded in 1977-78
 Donald Byrd, Getting Down to Business (Landmark, 1989)
 Eli Degibri, Israeli Song (Anzic, 2010)
 Eliane Elias, Illusions (Denon, 1986)
 Red Garland, Feelin' Red (Muse, 1978)
 Dexter Gordon, Biting the Apple (SteepleChase, 1976)
 Charlie Haden and Joe Henderson, The Montreal Tapes: Tribute to Joe Henderson (Verve, 2004) – recorded in 1989
 Sadik Hakim, Witches, Goblins, Etc. (1978)
 Jimmy Heath, New Picture (Landmark, 1985)
 Shirley Horn, I Remember Miles (Verve, 1998)
 Bobby Hutcherson, In the Vanguard (Landmark, 1987)
 Illinois Jacquet, The Soul Explosion (Prestige, 1969)
 Sam Jones, Visitation (SteepleChase, 1978)
 Yusef Lateef, The Doctor is In... and Out (Atlantic, 1976)
 Andy LaVerne and George Mraz, Time Well Spent (1994)
 Fred Lipsius, Larry Willis and George Mraz, Dreaming of Your Love (MJA, 1995)
 Lonnie Liston Smith, Make Someone Happy (Doctor Jazz, 1986)
 Joe Lovano, Celebrating Sinatra (1996)
 Johnny Lytle, Everything Must Change (1978)
 Hugh Masekela, Reconstruction (Uni, 1970)
 Ronnie Mathews, Roots, Branches & Dances (Bee Hive, 1978)
 Tete Montoliu, I Wanna Talk About You (SteepleChase, 1980)
 Sam Morrison, Dune (1976)
 Mike Nock, In, Out And Around (Timeless, 1978)
 Bud Shank, This Bud's for You... (Muse, 1985) – recorded in 1984
 Horace Silver, Silver 'n Brass (Blue Note, 1975)
 Reggie Workman, Cerebral Caverns (Postcards, 1995)
 Peter Zak, Paul Gill, Peter Zak Trio (Steeple Chase, 2004) – recorded in 2004

References

External links
 Official site 

American jazz drummers
Miles Davis
Musicians from New York (state)
1943 births
Living people
Musicians from Richmond, Virginia
20th-century American drummers
American male drummers
Jazz musicians from Virginia
American male jazz musicians
Quest (band) members